The Mercedes-Benz Bionic is a concept car created by DaimlerChrysler AG under the Mercedes Group. It was first introduced in 2005 at the DaimlerChrysler Innovation Symposium in Washington, D. C. The Bionic is modeled after a type of fish, the yellow boxfish, Ostracion cubicus, and also has 80% lower nitrogen oxide emissions with its selective catalytic reduction technology.

Engine and performance
The Bionic is powered by a 103 kW direct-injection diesel engine with an average fuel economy of 54.7 MPG (US) (~4.3 L/100 km).

Design
The exterior design was modeled after the yellow boxfish (Ostracion cubicus), a marine fish that lives in coral reefs. Mercedes-Benz decided to model the Bionic after this fish due to the supposed low coefficient of drag of its body shape and the rigidity of its exoskeleton; this influenced the car's unusual looks. It was believed that the shape of the boxfish would improve aerodynamics and stability. However, in 2015, a paper in Journal of the Royal Society Interface claimed that "The drag-reduction performance of the two boxfish species studied was relatively low compared with more generalized body shapes of fish".  Other parts of the design include the fact that the rear wheels are partially fitted with plastic and that it's considered as a lightweight vehicle. Mercedes-Benz reported a drag coefficient of 0.19; for comparison, the production vehicle with the lowest ever Cd value was the GM EV1, at 0.195. While the Bionic had a much larger internal volume than the EV1, the Bionic's larger frontal area made the EV1 more aerodynamic overall, as drag is a product of the area and the drag coefficient.

The vehicle was capable of seating four people.

References

External links
 The Mercedes-Benz Bionic Car as a concept vehicle
Mercedes-Benz UK Bionic Car description
Mercedes-Benz Bionic Concept Vehicle at WorldCarFans.com

Bionic
Cars introduced in 2005
Bionics